Lawtonka Acres is a census-designated place (CDP) in Comanche County, Oklahoma, United States. It was first listed as a CDP prior to the 2020 census.

The CDP is in northern Comanche County, at the north end of Lake Lawtonka, an impoundment on Medicine Creek, a southeast-flowing tributary of East Cache Creek, leading south to the Red River.

Demographics

See also
Robinsons Landing Marina

References 

Census-designated places in Comanche County, Oklahoma
Census-designated places in Oklahoma